Giorgi Guliashvili (born 5 September 2001) is a Georgian professional footballer who plays as a second striker for Sarajevo and Georgian U21 national team.

Club career
Guliashvili started playing for Saburtalo. He left the club in January 2023 for an undisclosed fee. In 2023, he moved to Bosnia and Herzegovina and signed for Sarajevo.

International career
Guliashvili is a member of the Georgia national under-21 team. He has represented Georgia at all youth levels.

Career statistics

Honours
Saburtalo Tbilisi
Erovnuli Liga: 2018
Georgian Cup: 2019, 2021
Georgian Super Cup: 2020

References

External links
 

1987 births
Living people
Footballers from Tbilisi
Georgia (country) under-21 international footballers
Expatriate footballers from Georgia (country)
Association football forwards
FK Sarajevo players
Erovnuli Liga players
Premier League of Bosnia and Herzegovina players
Expatriate footballers in Bosnia and Herzegovina
Expatriate sportspeople from Georgia (country) in Bosnia and Herzegovina